Hocus Pocus is a French hip hop / jazz band from Nantes. Formed in 1995, their music is a mix of hip hop, jazz, soul and funk. Originally being 20syl's brainchild, Hocus Pocus was formed in 1995, and gradually gained attention in the late '90s. The band, however, reached significant commercial and critical success in 2006 with the re-release of 2005 LP 73 Touches, the "Hip Hop?" single (featuring The Procussions) having hooked many listeners who were curious about its blend of French, English, and acoustic/electronic elements. Though quite far removed from legendary bands evolving in that same category (like The Roots), Hocus Pocus' more radio-friendly recipe happened to be very effective. The band came back in 2007 with a mixed live/studio LP, Place 54, featuring more international collaborations and another hit single, "Vocab!".

Members

20syl 
20syl (real name Sylvain Richard), the MC of the band, got his name from switching the "syl" and "vain" in his name to form "vainsyl". The number 20 in French, "vingt", pronounced "vain", was then substituted in for "vain", creating "20syl". He has also worked on individual projects, including the release of a solo EP Motifs in 2014, which included his collaboration with Oddisee, resulting in a charting single, "Ongoing Thing". Motifs II was released in 2015.

Members 
20syl
Matthieu Lelièvre – guitar
Hervé Godard – bass
Antoine Saint-Jean – drums
DJ Greem – DJ

Earlier members included Cambia, Yves-Dominique Richard and Yannick Busi.

Discography

Albums

Maxi singles 
 "On and On" (October 2001)
 "Conscient" (January 2003)
 "On and On – Part 2" (December 2004)

Collaborations

Discography: 20syl

EPs

Singles

References

External links 

 Official Site of On and On Records
 Interview: 20syl (of Hocus Pocus) | The Find Magazine
 Hocus Pocus on Last.fm

French hip hop groups
Musical groups from Pays de la Loire